Aria Sa'id (born 1989/1990) is an American transgender advocate and political strategist based in San Francisco. She is a co-founder (along with Janetta Johnson and Honey Mahogany) and the executive director of The Transgender District, and founder and director of the Kween Culture Initiative. Sa'id has also worked at the Trans:Thrive resource center, as program manager for St. James Infirmary, and as policy advisor for the San Francisco Human Rights Commission. In 2018, she was awarded the 10 Years of Service Award by San Francisco Pride.

See also
 List of LGBT people from Portland, Oregon

References

External links

Kween Culture Initiative

1990s births
African-American activists
LGBT African Americans
LGBT people from Oregon
People from San Francisco
Living people
Transgender women
Transgender rights activists
21st-century LGBT people